The Estadio Álvarez Claro is a stadium in Melilla, Spain. It is currently used for football matches and it is the home venue of UD Melilla. It was inaugurated on September 29, 1945. Owned by the autonomous city of Melilla, the stadium holds about 8,000 spectators.

References

External links
Stadium information (archived)
Estadios de España 

Municipal Alvarez Claro
UD Melilla
Sport in Melilla
Sports venues completed in 1945
Buildings and structures in Melilla